Varbitsa is a village in Northern Bulgaria. The village is located in Gorna Oryahovitsa Municipality, Veliko Tarnovo Province. Аccording to the numbers provided by the 2020 Bulgarian 

census, Varbitsa currently has a population of 1089 people with a permanent address registration in the settlement.

Geography 
The village is located 25 kilometers away from Veliko Tarnovo and 15 km away from Gorna Oryahovitsa. It lies on the shore of the Yantra River. The climate’s characteristic traits are a hot summer and a cold winter. 

The elevation of the village ranges between 50 and 99 meters, with an average elevation of 56 meters. 

The majority of the land area of the village (89%) is covered by agricultural territories, followed by 8% of urbanized areas and 3% of dams and rivers. The village has no forests within its area.

Culture 
The old name of the village was Vleshitsa, in 1936, it receives the name Varbitsa. In the nearby area Mustadzha there are traces of Roman and Thracian civilizations.

Buildings 

During the period after the merger of the two villages Sergyuvets and Teminsko, Parvomaytsi flourishes as a settlement. Most buildings were built during that time.

 In 1863, the village’s first school was established and built.
 In 1937, the municipality raised funds to build the church “Sv Georgi Pobedonosets”
 In 1894, the library and community hall “Gradina - Varbitsa 1894” was built.

Ethnicity 
According to the Bulgarian population census in 2011.

References 

Villages in Veliko Tarnovo Province